Sumariup is a Sepik language spoken in East Sepik Province, Papua New Guinea. It is spoken in the single village of Latoma in Karawari Rural LLG, East Sepik Province.

References

Bahinemo languages
Languages of East Sepik Province